Khalif Isse Mudan is the Minister of Security of Puntland.

References

Puntland politicians

Living people
Year of birth missing (living people)